Lars Eriksson (born April 16, 1961), is a retired ice hockey goaltender who spent 14 seasons with Brynäs IF. Eriksson won a WJC gold medal in 1981.

References

1961 births
Living people
Swedish ice hockey goaltenders
Brynäs IF players
Montreal Canadiens draft picks